Tanpopo (kanji: 蒲公英, hiragana: たんぽぽ, katakana: タンポポ), also transliterated as Tampopo, is the Japanese word for dandelion.

Tanpopo or Tampopo may refer to:

Books
Tanpopo (novel), final novel of Nobel Prize winner Yasunari Kawabata, 1964
Tanpopo, heroine of Yu Watase's manga Imadoki!

Film
Tanpopo (film), more often transliterated as Tampopo, 1985 Japanese film
Tanpopo (ja), a Japanese TV drama series written by Sugako Hashida (1973–1978)

Music

Bands
Tanpopo (band), a Hello! Project idol group

Songs
"Tanpopo", classical children's song by Nagayo Motoori to a poem by Shigeru Kuzuhara
"Tanpopo", classical song by Yoshinao Nakada to a poem of Tatsuji Miyoshi 
"Tanpopo" (ja), choral composition by Ko Matsushita to lyrics by (ja) Hourai Taizou
"Tanpopo" (ja), song by Hiromi Ota 1975, chart #33
"Tanpopo" (ja), song by 19 (band) 2002, chart #2
Tanpopo (song), song by Hello!, chart #10
"Tanpopo", theme song by Ayano Tsuji for Tensaikun
"Tanpopo", song by Spitz (band), from the debut album "Spitz".
"Tanpopo", song by Yusuke Kamiji 2009, chart #17
"Tanpopo", song by Garo (band) 1971
"Tanpopo", song by comedy duo Brief & Trunks
"Tanpopo", song by Rie Tanaka 2008

Other uses
Tanpopo (mission), orbital mission on the International Space Station
Tanpopo Prize (ja), horse racing prize